Neapolitan cuisine has ancient historical roots that date back to the Greco-Roman period, which was enriched over the centuries by the influence of the different cultures that controlled Naples and its kingdoms, such as that of Aragon and France.

Since Naples was the capital of the Kingdom of Naples, its cuisine took much from the culinary traditions of all the Campania region, reaching a balance between dishes based on rural ingredients (pasta, vegetables, cheese) and seafood dishes (fish, crustaceans, mollusks). A vast variety of recipes is influenced by the local aristocratic cuisine, such as timballo and the sartù di riso, pasta or rice dishes with very elaborate preparation, and dishes from popular traditions prepared with inexpensive but nutritionally healthy ingredients, like pasta e fagioli (pasta with beans) and other pasta dishes with vegetables.

Historical background

Naples has a history that goes back many centuries: the city itself predates many others in that area of the world, including Rome. It has endured the Greeks, Romans, the Goths, the Byzantines, and dozens of successions of kings from France and Spain. Each culture left a mark on the way food is prepared in Naples and Campania itself.

Finding the connections between modern and Greco-Roman culinary traditions is not always easy. Among the traces of classical culinary tastes, plates from the period of Greek rule found in Magna Graecia (southern Italy) depict fishes and mollusks, an indication that seafood was appreciated during that period. Frescoes from Pompeii depict fruit baskets filled with figs and pomegranates. An excavation at Oplontis in the Villa Poppaea shows a fresco of a cake, the ingredients of which are not yet known.

The Roman garum is the ancient sauce most similar to that used for the modern Colatura di Alici, typical of Cetara. It can be traced back to the sweet-sour taste typical of the Roman cooking described by Apicius, along with the use of raisins in salty dishes, like the pizza di scarola (endive pie), or the braciole al ragù (meat rolls in ragù sauce). The use of wheat in the modern pastiera cake, typical of Easter, could have had originally a symbolic meaning, related to cults of Artemis, Cybele and Ceres and pagan rituals of fertility, celebrated around the Spring equinox. The name struffoli, a Christmas cake, comes from the Greek word στρόγγυλος (stróngylos, meaning "round-shaped").

The Spanish and French sovereignty in Naples initiated the difference between the cuisine of the aristocrats and that of the poorer classes. The former was characterized by elaborate, more cosmopolitan, dishes, and a greater number of expensive ingredients, including meat. The poor used foods that were cheaper and could be grown locally (that is, cereals and vegetables). These were embellished over the centuries and came into contact with the influence of the aristocratic cuisine, so that today traditional recipes of the poorer classes have often acquired great quality and taste, while preserving the original simple ingredients.

Typical ingredients

Pasta

There is a great variety of Neapolitan pastas. Pasta was not invented in Naples, but one of the best grades available is found quite close by, in Gragnano, a few kilometers from the capital. It was here also that the industrial production of pasta started, with the techniques to dry and preserve it. The main ingredient is durum wheat, harder to manipulate than soft wheat, so the industrial production had greater success than in northern Italy, where home-made pasta is more popular. Traditionally in Naples pasta must be cooked "al dente", while soft pasta is not tolerated.

The most popular variety of pasta, besides the classic spaghetti and linguine, are the paccheri and the ziti, long pipe-shaped pasta, broken by hand before cooking and usually topped with Neapolitan ragù. Pasta with vegetables is usually also prepared with pasta mista (pasta ammescata in Neapolitan language), which is now produced industrially as a distinct variety of pasta, but which was once sold cheaply, made up of broken pieces of different kinds of pasta.

Hand-made gnocchi, prepared with flour and potatoes, have become a popular method of overcoming the Neapolitan disdain for potatoes. In 1949 W. H. Auden wrote Igor Stravinsky from Forio in Ischia, "Forio thinks us crazy because we eat potatoes, which are to them a mark of abject poverty." In reporting this, Francis Steegmuller, a longtime resident of Naples, remarks on the French-inspired gattò, in which "the potato complement is nearly overwhelmed by cheese, ham and other ingredients".  
Some of the more modern varieties of pasta, like scialatelli, are also becoming popular.

Tomatoes

Tomatoes entered the Neapolitan cuisine during the 18th century.
The industry of preserving tomatoes originated in 19th-century Naples, resulting in the export to all parts of the world of the famous "pelati" (peeled tomatoes) and the "concentrato" (tomato paste). There are traditionally several ways of preparing home-made tomato preserves, either bottled tomato juice, or chopped into pieces. The famous "conserva" (sun dried concentrated juice) tomato is cooked for a long time and becomes a dark red cream with a velvety texture.

Vegetables
Some Campanian dishes using vegetables, like the parmigiana di melanzane (aubergine pie) or peperoni ripieni (stuffed peppers) can become real stars of the table. Some of the most typical products are friarielli (a local variety of Brassica rapa), Cichorium endivia, smooth or curly (two varieties of endive), several types of broccoli, verza (Savoy cabbage, a variety of Brassica oleracea sabauda) and others, used to prepare the minestra maritata. Different types of beans, chickpeas and other legumes are very popular.

Zucchini are widely used; the largest ones are fried with vinegar and fresh mint (a scapece). The male flowers of zucchini can be fried in a salty dough.

Regular red and yellow peppers are widely used, and a local variety of small green peppers (not spicy), peperoncini verdi, are usually fried.

Salad is a side dish of many dishes, especially seafood ones. Lettuce, and more often the incappucciata (a local variety of the iceberg lettuce), more crispy, is mixed with carrots, fennel, rucola (some time ago it spontaneously grew in landfields, and was sold in the streets together with the less noble pucchiacchella), radishes, traditionally the long and spicy ones, which today are more and more rare, almost completely replaced by the round and sweeter ones.

Black olives used in Neapolitan cooking are always the ones from Gaeta.

During the Second World War, it was not rare, in the poorest families, to use less appealing ingredients. Recipes have been reported of pasta cooked with empty pods of fava beans or peas.

Cheese

Cheeses, both soft and aged, are an important part of the Italian diet and also have their place in Neapolitan cooking: some recipes are descended from very old Roman traditions.
Starting from the freshest ones, the most used are:
Commonly found now as a filling for certain pastas.

Seafood

Neapolitan cooking has always used an abundance of all kinds of seafood from the Tyrrhenian sea. Dr Johnson's friend Hester Thrale was enthusiastic for "the most excellent, the most incomparable fish I ever ate; red mullets large as our mackerel, and of singularly high flavour; beside calamaro or ink-fish, a dainty worth of imperial luxury". In 1759, when Ferdinando Galiani was sent as secretary to the Neapolitan ambassador in Paris, he pined for familiar foods; he found "no fruit, no cheese, no good seafood— everything here does violence to the Neapolitan temperament".
Fishes of very small size are also used:
 The , baby fishes, very small and transparent, prepared either steamed or fried in a dough.

The baccalà (cod) and stockfish, imported from northern Europe seas, are either fried or cooked with potatoes and tomatoes.

Most cephalopods are employed (octopus, squid, cuttlefish), as well as crustacea (mainly shrimp).

Clams require a special note.

It is now forbidden by law to sell and eat the sea dates (datteri di mare, Lithophaga lithophaga), as their fishing seriously damages coastline rocks, mainly in the Sorrento peninsula.

Meat
Meat is not used as frequently in Neapolitan cooking as in the cuisine of Northern Italy. The most common kinds of meat used in Neapolitan cooking are:

 pork liver, rounded in a net of pork's fat and a bay leaf.
 braciole, pork rolls stuffed with raisins, pine nuts and parsley, fixed with toothpicks and cooked in ragù.
 lamb and goat are roasted, usually with potatoes and peas, typically around Easter.
 rabbit and chicken, often cooked alla cacciatora, pan fried with tomatoes.
 beef or other red meat with tomatoes, cooked for a long time to tenderise an inexpensive piece of meat as in Carne alla pizzaiola.

Bread

The most popular bread is pane cafone prepared with natural yeast, cooked in a wood-fired oven with hard crust and large holes inside. Also used are sfilatini, somewhat similar to a French baguette, but shorter and thicker. Rosetta rolls and other varieties are also present.

Pasta dishes
From the classic "pummarola" (tomato sauce) to the simplest aglio e uoglio (garlic and oil), down to a wide variety of sauces, with vegetables or seafood, up to the ragù, southern Italy's creativity enhances its pasta dishes.

Pasta dishes of the poor
Cuisine traditionally attributed to the poor often mixes pasta with legumes. The most popular are: pasta e fagioli (pasta with beans), sometimes enriched with pork rind (cotiche), pasta e ceci (pasta with chickpeas), pasta e lenticchie (pasta with lentils), pasta e piselli (pasta with peas). Nowadays cicerchie (Lathyrus sativus) have become very rare. Similarly to legumes, other vegetables are associated with pasta, like pasta e patate (pasta with potatoes), pasta e cavolfiore (pasta with cauliflower), pasta e zucca (pasta with pumpkin). The most traditional cooking method consists in cooking the condiments first, for instance, pan fry garlic with oil, then add steamed beans, or fry onion and celery, then add potatoes cut into little dices; then, after frying, water is added, brought to boiling temperature, salted, and pasta is added and stirred frequently. While cooking with all the other ingredients, pasta does not lose its starch, which would have been lost if cooked separately in salty water and then drained. Cooking pasta together with vegetables makes the sauce creamier ("azzeccato"), and is a way of preparing pasta distinct from the tradition of "noble" cuisine, which prepares similar dishes in a way more similar to broth or soups, adding pasta after cooking it separately. One more hearty dish in the cuisine of the poor is pasta simply cooked with cheese and eggs stracciatella (pasta caso e ova).

Spaghetti, dressed with tomato sauce, black olives from Gaeta and capers are called spaghetti alla puttanesca. An imaginative recipe was created on the tables of the poor, where the expensive shellfishes were missing: spaghetti, dressed with cherry tomatoes sauce, garlic, oil and parsley are called  (spaghetti with escaped clams), where clams are present only in the imagination of the people eating the dish.

Frittata with spaghetti
The frittata can be prepared with pasta leftovers, either with tomato sauce or white. Pasta, cooked al dente is mixed with raw scrambled egg and cheese, then pan fried. It can be enriched with many different ingredients. Must be cooked on both sides, flipped with the help of a plate. If well cooked, it is compact, and can be cut into slices. It can be eaten during outdoor lunches.

Richer pasta dishes
The aristocratic cuisine used pasta for elaborate recipes, like the timballi, rarely used in everyday food.

Richer sauces, more elaborate than the vegetable pasta dishes mentioned above, that are frequently used to dress pasta include:
 The Bolognese sauce, vaguely inspired by the ragù emiliano, prepared with minced carrot, celery, onion, ground beef and tomato.
 The Genovese sauce, not inspired by Genoa in spite of the name, but prepared with meat browned with abundant onions and other aromatics.

With the Neapolitan ragù the most traditionally used pasta are the ziti, long macaroni, that are broken into shorter pieces by hand before cooking.

Seafood pasta dishes

Spaghetti, linguine and paccheri match very well with fish and seafood. From this union come the dishes typical of important lunches or dinners (weddings, in particular). The most typical ones are:
  or other shellfishes (clams, mussels, and other).
  (and more).
 , with squid sauce, cooked with white wine.

There are many more varieties, for instance spaghetti with a white sauce of Mediterranean cod.

Sometimes the traditional dishes of pasta with legumes can be mixed with seafood, so there are, for instance, pasta e fagioli con le cozze (pasta with beans and mussels), or other more modern variations, like pasta with zucchini and clams, that lose any traditional connotation.

Rice dishes
The most famous rice dish is the sartù di riso, a sort of timballo made with rice, stuffed with chicken livers, sausage, little meatballs, fior di latte or provola, peas, mushrooms, and with Neapolitan ragù, or, in the white version ("in bianco") with béchamel sauce.

In the cuisine of the poor, rice is also cooked as riso e verza (rice with cabbage), flavored with little pieces of Parmigiano–Reggiano cheese crusts that slightly melt while cooking.

A seafood rice dish is the risotto alla pescatora ("fisherman's risotto"), prepared with various mollusks (different types of clams, squid and cuttlefish), shrimps and a broth made from the boiling of seafood shells.

Arancini (palle 'e riso), more typical of Sicilian cuisine, are also frequently eaten in Naples.

Pizza

Pizza is the most popular and best known creation of all Neapolitan cuisine. It soon became very popular among the people as well as barons or princes: it was present in the Bourbon court. King Ferdinand I experienced cooking pizza in Capodimonte's porcelain ovens. After Italian unification, the new kings were also attracted by this southern food. The pizzaiolo Raffaele Esposito is often credited with popularising a particular variety of Neapolitan pizza. In 1889 he prepared in honor of queen Margherita of Savoy  a nationalistic pizza, where the colours of the Italian flag were represented by the mozzarella (white), tomato (red) and basil (green). Since then this pizza is called the pizza Margherita. Pizza can be cheap and nutritious, so it had great success very quickly. Sometimes pizza is made in home ovens, but the real Neapolitan pizza must be cooked in a wood-fired oven, hand-made by an able pizzaiolo who makes the dough disk thinner in the center and thicker in the outer part; the ingredients and olive oil are rapidly spread on the disk, and with a quick movement the pizza is put on the shovel and then slid in the oven where it is turned around a few times for uniform cooking.

Fish and seafood dishes
One of the most famous main courses is a seafood dish recipe coming from the quarter 'Santa Lucia': polpi alla luciana, octopus cooked with chili pepper and tomato. Octopus is also simply steamed, and prepared as salad with lemon juice, parsley and green olives. A richer seafood salad can be prepared also mixing squid, cuttlefish and prawns.

Medium size fishes are cooked all'acqua pazza, with tomato, garlic and parsley; the larger ones are simply grilled, accompanied, in the most important meals, with king size prawns.

Mussels are prepared in different ways: rapidly steamed with black pepper (all'impepata), and dressed with a few drops of lemon juice each; also cooked al gratin. Clams and other shellfishes are also cooked sauté, rapidly passed in a large pan with olive oil, garlic, and served on crust breads.

Cheap fish can also produce very tasty recipes. The most popular one is anchovy.
The best recipes are:
 , boneless anchovies, passed in flour, egg and deep-fried.
 , raw anchovies marinated in lemon juice or vinegar, then dressed with olive oil, garlic and parsley.
 , boneless anchovies, rapidly cooked in a large pan with olive oil, lemon juice and origanum.

, the tiny baby fishes, are either steamed and dressed with oil and lemon, or deep-fried in a light dough, which is also used to deep-fry little pieces of some sea algae.

The  (deep-fried fishes) is usually done with small-sized local fishes, like cod, goatfish, anchovies and others. It should be eaten very hot, right after being fried.

Vegetable dishes

Vegetable dishes can become very rich and elaborated. The most famous are:
 The parmigiana di melanzane, aubergine pie with tomato sauce and fiordilatte.
 The , potato pie stuffed with cheese and salami.
 The peperoni ripieni, stuffed whole peppers.
 The melanzane a barchetta, aubergines cut in half, the center scooped out and filled with different types of stuffing.

Fried food
Fried fish was already mentioned above in the text; many vegetables are deep-fried with flour and egg (dorate e fritte): artichoke, zucchini, cauliflower. The richest version add pieces of liver, ricotta and, in the past, cow's brain. Mozzarella can be prepared dorata e fritta as well and also in carrozza, passed in flour and egg together with two bread slices softened in milk, to form a small sandwich.

Onions, fried up to a golden color, are the base for the famous frittata di cipolle (onion omelette).

Side dishes
After pasta, the main second-course meals are frequently accompanied by side dishes.
The most popular ones are:
 Zucchine alla scapece, deep fried sliced zucchini dressed with vinegar and fresh mint.
 , fried aubergines, in two versions: stick-shaped and fried, then dressed with cherry tomato sauce, or dice-fried, with no tomato.
 Peperoni in padella, sliced peppers pan-fried with black Gaeta olives and capers.

 Peperoncini verdi fritti, local small non-spicy green peppers, dressed with cherry tomato sauce.
 Friarielli, local vegetable leaves, pan-fried with oil, garlic and chili pepper.

Savory pies
Savory pies are convenient for outdoor food. The most popular savory pies are:
 The  (endive pie), prepared with fried scarole with garlic, pine nuts, raisins, black Gaeta olives and capers. Those vegetables are the stuffing for the pie, which is made with a simple dough of flour, water and yeast.
 The casatiello, or tortano, typical of Easter holidays, usually prepared for the day after Easter, usually spent outdoor.

Cakes and desserts

Neapolitan cuisine has a large variety of cakes and desserts. The most famous ones are:
 babà, small cake saturated in syrup made with hard liquor.
 sfogliatella, in two varieties: frolla (smooth) or riccia (curly). Two variation are the santa Rosa, larger and with an additional stuffing of cream and black cherry, and the coda d'aragosta (lobster tail), with a bignè inside and stuffed with various types of cream.
 Zeppole, deep fried or baked.
 Pastiera, prepared for Easter holidays.
 Struffoli typical Christmas cake.
 

Ice creams are famous as well.

Holiday food

Holiday recipes deserve a dedicated section because of their variety and richness.

Christmas
Christmas Eve dinner is usually the time when all family members
join.

Christmas cakes are:
 Struffoli
 
 Mustacciuoli
 

Christmas Eve dinner is completed with the ciociole, which are dried fruits (walnuts, hazelnuts and almonds), dried figs and the castagne del prete, baked chestnuts.

Christmas lunch has typically the minestra maritata or hand-made pasta with chicken broth.

Easter food

The main Easter dishes are the Casatiello or tortano, a salty pie made with bread dough stuffed with various types of salami and cheese, also used the day after Easter for outdoor lunches. Typical of Easter lunches and dinners is the fellata, a banquet of salami and capocollo and salty ricotta. Typical dishes are also lamb or goat baked with potatoes and peas. Easter cake is the pastiera.

Other holidays
Carnival has the Neapolitan version of lasagna, that has no béchamel sauce, unlike other Italian versions. As dessert, there is the Sanguinaccio dolce with savoiardi biscuits, or also the chiacchiere, diffused all over Italy with different names.

2 November (All Souls Day) cake is the torrone dei morti, which, unlike the usual torrone is not made with honey and almonds, but with cocoa and a variety of stuffings, like hazelnuts, dried and candy fruits or also coffee and more.

Fruit
Fruit is often present at the end of a meal. Local production is abundant, one of the most popular local products is the annurca apple, a local type of apple whose origins are old indeed: it is believed to have first been planted by the Romans. Slices of watermelon ( 'o mellone) were in old times sold in little street shops (mellunari), nowadays disappeared. The sweet and tasty yellow peach ('o percuoco c' 'o pizzo, in Neapolitan) is also sometimes used, chopped in pieces to add flavor to red wine coming from Monte di Procida, cold and somewhat similar to Spanish sangria.

Wine
Many wines from Campania match very well to the local cuisine. Among white wines the most famous are Greco di Tufo, Falanghina, Fiano di Avellino and Asprinio di Aversa, while the most famous red wines are Aglianico, Taurasi DOCG,  also known as pere 'e palummo, Solopaca, Lacryma Christi from Vesuvius, that is produced both white and red.

Liqueurs
The most abundant lunches or dinners end with coffee and liqueur. Limoncello is now world-famous, but once upon a time the most preferred one was the liquore ai quattro frutti, with lemon, orange, tangerine e limo (not to be confused with lime),
which is a local variation of bergamot orange, now very rare.
Nocillo is also very popular all over Italy, and is the most appreciated bitter liqueur.

Neapolitan street food
In Naples, the use of buying and eating food in the streets dates to very ancient times. The origins probably date back to Roman thermopolia or maybe earlier.
Pizza is also prepared in small sizes to be eaten in the street, the so-called pizza a libretto, still found in Naples pizzerias in via dei Tribunali, port'Alba and piazza Cavour. In via Pignasecca, in the historical center, there are still some  shops, selling various types of tripe, 'O pere e 'o musso (pork's foot and cow's nose) or the old  (tripe soup).

From Mergellina to via Caracciolo there are still several little shops selling  (salty biscuits with pork's fat and black pepper). Nowadays the old typical  'o broro 'e purpo (octopus broth) has become extremely rare to find.
A few decades ago, street shops sold 'o spassatiempo, a mix of baked hazelnuts, pumpkin seeds, toasted chickpeas and lupins under brine.

Fusion cuisine
Many Neapolitan cookery books report classic recipes, but also re-interpretations in Neapolitan style of other recipes. Books with both classic and revisited recipes are:
 Jeanne Caròla Francesconi, La vera cucina di Napoli, edit. Newton, 1995,
 Frijenno Magnanno, Salvatore di Fraia, Editore, Pozzuoli (NA): Contains a large variety of recipes and creative Neapolitan dishes.

Notes

References
The oldest Neapolitan cuisine is reported in the books of classic authors, including:
 Vincenzo Corrado, Il cuoco galante, in Napoletan language, III edition, 1786, editby Forni, Sala Bolognese (BO), 1990.
 Vincenzo Corrado, Pranzi giornalieri variati ed imbanditi in 672 vivande secondo i prodotti della stagione, in Napoletan language, III edition, 1832, re-edit by Grimaldi, Naples, 2001.
 Ippolito Cavalcanti Cucina casareccia, in Napoletan language, 1839, re-edited by Il Polifilo, Milan, 2005
 Ippolito Cavalcanti Cucina teorico - pratica, in lingua napoletana, 1852, re-edited by Grimaldi, Naples, 2002

 
Culture in Naples
Cuisine of Campania